Rifugio Vittorio Sella (quoted as Refuge Victor Sella in French sources) is a mountain hut in the Alps in Aosta Valley, Italy.

References

External links
 Rifugio Vittorio Sella

Mountain huts in Aosta Valley